The Luna gas field is a natural gas field on the continental shelf of the Ionian Sea. It was discovered in 1971 and developed by Eni. It began production in 1975 and produces natural gas and condensates. The total proven reserves of the Luna gas field are around 1.3 trillion cubic feet (37×109m³), and production is slated to be around 142 million cubic feet/day (4×106m³) in 2010.

References

Natural gas fields in Italy